Vyacheslav Vladimirovich Dmitriyenko (born 6 March 1977) is a Russian professional football coach and a former player. He is the goalkeepers' coach at FC Chayka Peschanokopskoye.

Club career
Dmitriyenko played in the Russian Football National League for FC SKA Rostov-on-Don in 2008.

External links
 

1977 births
Living people
Russian footballers
FC SKA Rostov-on-Don players
FC Taganrog players
Association football goalkeepers